All-Big Ten may refer to:

List of All-Big Ten Conference football teams
List of All-Big Ten Hockey Teams